Mount Goossens is a largely bare rock massif,  high, standing next south of Mount Pierre in the Queen Fabiola Mountains of Antarctica. It was discovered on October 7, 1960, by the Belgian Antarctic Expedition, under Guido Derom, who named it for Leon Goossens, photographer of the Belgian party which made reconnoitering aircraft flights in this area.

References

Mountains of Queen Maud Land
Prince Harald Coast